Carmen de Patagones Airport  is an airport serving the city of Carmen de Patagones in the Buenos Aires Province of Argentina. The airport is on the northern edge of Carmen de Patagones.

See also

Transport in Argentina
List of airports in Argentina

References

External links
OurAirports - Carmen de Patagones Airport

Airports in Buenos Aires Province